Stary Zdrój is a district of the city of Wałbrzych in southwestern Poland. 

Formerly a spa town, it is located 43 m. by rail S.W. from Wrocław, and 3 m. N. from centre of Wałbrzych. It has factories for glass, porcelain (Fabryka Porcelany Wałbrzych S.A.), machinery, cotton-spinning, iron-foundries and used to have coal-mines.

The oldest known mention of the settlement comes from a 1357 document from the nearby Krzeszów Abbey, when it was under Polish rule as part of the Duchy of Świdnica. In 1900 the population was 12,144. There are two historic churches and a railway station in Stary Zdrój.

Gallery

References

Neighbourhoods in Poland
Wałbrzych